Gilu may refer to:

 Gilu Joseph (born 1999), Malayali poet and lyricist
 Mary Gilu, Vanuatuan politician